Grande Prémio Internacional Costa Azul was a stage cycling race held annually in Portugal. It was part of UCI Europe Tour in category 2.1 from 2005 to 2006.

Winners

References

UCI Europe Tour races
Cycle races in Portugal
Recurring sporting events established in 1989
Recurring sporting events disestablished in 2009
Winter events in Portugal
Defunct cycling races in Portugal